David Charles Humphrey Townsend (20 April 1912 – 27 January 1997) was an English cricketer who played in three Test matches in 1935.

Born in Norton, County Durham, David Townsend was educated at Winchester College and New College, Oxford. He was a right-handed batsman, sometimes used as an opener, who holds the record of being the last cricketer to have played Test cricket for England without playing for one of the first-class English counties. Townsend's first-class cricket was principally for Oxford University and he won his Blue in the University match in 1933 and 1934. But his other cricket was mainly for Durham, which was at that time one of the Minor Counties.

After two good university seasons, Townsend was picked for a rather makeshift Marylebone Cricket Club (MCC) side that toured the West Indies in 1934-35 under Bob Wyatt. He opened in three of the four Tests but was not a success, and the series as a whole was won by the West Indian cricket team, the side's first series victory. Townsend played little first-class cricket after this tour, though his final match was not until 1948.

Townsend was the son of Charles Townsend, also an England Test player, and his own son, Jonathan, played first-class cricket for Oxford University in the 1960s. David Townsend died at age 84 in Norton, County Durham.

References

 Wisden Cricketers' Almanack, 1934, 1935 and 1936 editions.
 Who's Who of Cricketers, by Philip Bailey, Philip Thorn and Peter Wynne-Thomas

External links

Gene genie
Bodyline's final fling

England Test cricketers
English cricketers
Oxford University cricketers
Durham cricketers
Free Foresters cricketers
1912 births
1997 deaths
People from Norton, County Durham
Cricketers from County Durham
Minor Counties cricketers
Marylebone Cricket Club cricketers
Durham cricket captains
Cricketers from Yorkshire
People educated at Winchester College
Alumni of New College, Oxford
English cricketers of 1919 to 1945
Marylebone Cricket Club West Indian Touring Team cricketers